Bad Boys for Life is a 2020 American buddy cop action comedy film directed by Adil & Bilall. It is the sequel to Bad Boys II (2003) and the third installment in the Bad Boys franchise. Will Smith and Martin Lawrence reprise their starring roles in the film and are joined by Paola Núñez, Vanessa Hudgens, Jacob Scipio, Alexander Ludwig, Charles Melton, Kate del Castillo, Nicky Jam,  and Joe Pantoliano. The film was produced by Smith, Jerry Bruckheimer, and Doug Belgrad, with a screenplay written by Chris Bremner, Peter Craig and Joe Carnahan. In Bad Boys for Life, Miami detectives Mike Lowrey and Marcus Burnett investigate a string of murders tied to Lowrey's troubled past.

A third Bad Boys film was contemplated following the release of the second film in 2003, with Michael Bay stating he would be interested in returning to direct, but budgetary constraints led to stalled efforts. Over the years, a variety of writers and directors were attached as the film went through multiple attempts to enter production. The project was eventually finalized and green-lit in October 2018, and filming began the following year, lasting from January to June 2019. Principal photography took place in Atlanta, Miami, and Mexico City.

Bad Boys for Life was theatrically released in the United States on January 17, 2020, by Sony Pictures Releasing under the Columbia Pictures label. The film was generally well received by critics and grossed $426.5 million worldwide, becoming the third highest-grossing January release of all time. It was also the fourth highest-grossing film of 2020 and the highest-grossing film in the franchise. A sequel is in development.

Plot
Isabel Aretas, widow of drug kingpin Benito, escapes from a Mexican prison with the aid of her son Armando. Isabel sends Armando to Miami, tasking him with recovering a substantial stash of money his father Benito had hidden, as well as assassinating the people responsible for his father's arrest and eventual death in prison. Isabel demands that Armando should also kill Detective Mike Lowrey, who is settled in Miami but save him for last. Mike accompanies his partner Marcus Burnett to the birth of his first grandson. 

Desiring to spend more time with his family, Marcus tells Mike he intends to retire, to Mike's chagrin. During a party celebrating Marcus's grandson, Mike is shot by Armando and left in a coma for months. Chastised by Isabel for targeting Mike first, Armando continues to assassinate other targets on his list during Mike's convalescence. Following Mike's recovery, he is determined to seek revenge and unsuccessfully attempts to recruit the now-retired Marcus, causing a fall out between them. 

Mike violently obtains the identity of arms dealer Booker Grassie from an informant. Realizing that Mike will not heed orders to stay away from the investigation, Captain Howard reluctantly allows him to work with the tech-driven team in charge, the Advanced Miami Metro Operations (A.M.M.O.), led by Mike's ex-girlfriend Rita. While the team surveils Grassie at an arms deal, Mike determines that the buyers intend to kill Grassie and intervene, but fails to save him. Later, Marcus is called by Carver Remy, an old informant who believes the assassin is after him. 

Marcus contacts Mike and the pair travel to Carver, but are too late to save him. Armando escapes after a fistfight with Mike. Captain Howard later reveals his intentions to retire as well, offering advice to Mike that he needs to find a path forward in life. He is abruptly assassinated by Armando moments later. The captain's death pulls Marcus out of retirement, but he intends to work as a team with A.M.M.O. They track down Grassie's accountant, who leads them to Lorenzo "Zway-Lo" Rodriguez. 

They infiltrate Zway-Lo's birthday party leading to a destructive car chase. Armando arrives in a helicopter to rescue Zway-Lo but kills him when he blocks Armando's way to shoot the pursuing Mike. As he lines up a shot, Armando tells Mike "Hasta el fuego". Gunfire from Marcus creates cover for Mike, who falls into the water below. A.M.M.O. is shut down because of the failed operation. In private, Mike reveals to Marcus that Armando may be his son. Before partnering with Marcus, Mike worked as an undercover officer in the Aretas cartel where he met Isabel. They fell in love and intended to run away together, using "Hasta el fuego" as a made-up secret catchphrase. 

Mike ultimately remained loyal to the police, realizing how dangerous Isabel would become. Despite Mike's opposition, Marcus and A.M.M.O. join him in Mexico City to confront her. At the Hidalgo Palace, Mike meets Isabel and scolds her for concealing the truth from him. A shootout quickly ensues between A.M.M.O. and Isabel's men. Marcus shoots the pilot of Isabel's support helicopter, causing it to crash into the central lobby, and start a fire. Marcus confronts Isabel, while Mike tells the truth to Armando.

Demanding the truth from his mother, Isabel confirms to Armando that Mike is his father. Realizing the task he spent a lifetime training for was a lie, Armando tries to reason with his mother, leading to Isabel inadvertently shooting Armando in the chest while aiming for Mike. Enraged, she attempts to shoot Mike, but Rita intervenes and shoots Isabel, sending her falling to her death into the flames below. Sometime later, Rita has been promoted to Captain, while Mike and Marcus are placed in charge of A.M.M.O. Mike visits a remorseful Armando in prison, offering him a chance to earn some redemption, which he accepts.

Cast

 Will Smith as Detective Lieutenant Michael Eugene 'Mike' Lowrey, Marcus' partner/best friend/brother.
 Martin Lawrence as Detective Lieutenant Marcus Miles Burnett, Mike's partner/best friend/brother.
 Paola Núñez as Lieutenant Rita Secada, head of AMMO and Mike's ex-girlfriend.
 Vanessa Hudgens as Kelly, weapons expert of AMMO
 Jacob Scipio as Armando Aretas, Mike and Isabel's son
 Alexander Ludwig as Dorn, tech expert of AMMO
 Charles Melton as Rafe, member of AMMO
 Kate del Castillo as Isabel 'La Bruja' Aretas, Mike's ex-lover and Armando's mother
 Nicky Jam as Lorenzo 'Zway-Lo' Rodríguez
 Joe Pantoliano as Captain Conrad Howard
 Theresa Randle as Theresa Burnett, Marcus' wife
 Massi Furlan as Lee Taglin
 Happy Anderson as Jenkins
 Dennis Greene as Reggie McDonald
 Bianca Bethune as Megan Burnett, Marcus' daughter
 Michael Bay as Wedding M.C.
 DJ Khaled as Manny the Butcher
 Rory Markham as Booker Grassie

Production

Development
Michael Bay, the director of the first two Bad Boys films, stated in June 2008 that he might direct Bad Boys 3, but that the greatest obstacle would be cost considering both Will Smith and himself demanded some of the highest salaries in the film industry. By August 2009, Columbia Pictures had hired Peter Craig to write a script for the sequel. In February 2011, Martin Lawrence stated that the film was in development.

Following several delays, Jerry Bruckheimer announced in June 2014 that screenwriter David Guggenheim was working on the storyline for the sequel. Two months later, Lawrence said a script had been written and roles had been cast. The following year in June 2015, it was reported that director Joe Carnahan was in early talks to write and possibly direct the film. Sony Pictures Entertainment announced a short time later in August 2015 that there were plans for two sequels, with Bad Boys 3 scheduled for release on February 17, 2017, followed by Bad Boys 4 on July 3, 2019. In early 2016, Bad Boys 3 was pushed to June 2, 2017, with no update on the release date of Bad Boys 4. Producers had planned to begin production in early 2017. Another delay surfaced in August 2016, when, to avoid competition with the upcoming DC Comics film Wonder Woman, the studio pushed the film's release to January 12, 2018. It was also revealed that the film would be titled Bad Boys for Life. In an October 2016 interview on Jimmy Kimmel Live!, Lawrence said filming might begin in March 2017. In December 2016, an updated release date for Bad Boys 4 was set for May 24, 2019.

Sony announced in February 2017 that the film's release would be delayed for a third time to November 9, 2018. The following month, Carnahan left the movie due to scheduling conflicts. In August 2017, Sony removed the third film from their release schedule, and later in the month Lawrence said the film would not happen.

Planning resumed in February 2018 as Belgian directors Adil El Arbi and Bilall Fallah were signed, after development on Beverly Hills Cop IV stalled, in place of Carnahan, and Smith and Lawrence were confirmed to reprise. Geek Worldwide reported that the third installment in the Bad Boys franchise would film from November 2018 to March 2019 in Miami and Atlanta, with the release date scheduled for January 17, 2020.

Casting
In October 2018, Variety revealed that Sony was close to green-lighting the film's production. It was reported in December 2018 that Joe Pantoliano would reprise his role as Captain Howard from the previous films. Kate del Castillo joined the cast in early 2019, and it reported soon after Theresa Randle would reprise her role as Marcus' wife, Theresa, marking her first film appearance in 10 years.

Filming
Principal photography began on January 14, 2019, in downtown Atlanta. Shooting also took place in Mexico City in April 2019, as well as in Miami, wrapping on June 7, 2019. Cinematographer Robrecht Heyvaert shot the film with Sony CineAlta VENICE digital cameras and Panavision Primo, G- and T-Series anamorphic lenses.

Music

The film was composed by Lorne Balfe, whose new music was integrated with Mark Mancina's themes from the first film. Both trailers for the film include a remix/mashup of "Bad Boys" by Inner Circle (the franchise's theme) and "Bad Boy for Life" by P. Diddy, Black Rob and Mark Curry.

The official soundtrack album to the film, Bad Boys for Life: The Soundtrack was announced by its executive producer, DJ Khaled, and released on the same day as the film. Black Eyed Peas and J Balvin recorded a song titled "Ritmo", released October 11, 2019, which served as a lead single for the film's soundtrack.

The soundtrack also features tracks by many artists, including Nicky Jam, Quavo, Rick Ross, Meek Mill, Buju Banton, Bryson Tiller, City Girls, Pitbull, and DJ Durel.

Release

Theatrical
The first official trailer for Bad Boys for Life debuted on September 4, 2019, and its second trailer was released on November 5. Its world premiere was held at the TCL Chinese Theatre on January 14, 2020. Will Smith and Martin Lawrence arrived at the premiere driving a Porsche 911 Carrera 4S with the Bad Boys theme playing loudly from the car's audio system. Bad Boys for Life was theatrically released in the United States on January 17, 2020, by Sony Pictures Releasing.

Home media
Bad Boys for Life was released digitally in the United States and Canada through Premium VOD on March 31, 2020, before the end of the usual 90-day theatrical run. The film was released on 4K Ultra HD, Blu-ray, and DVD on April 21, 2020.

Reception

Box office
Bad Boys for Life grossed $204.4 million in the United States and Canada, and $220.2 million in other territories, for a worldwide total of $424.6 million, against a production budget of $90 million. It is both the highest-grossing film in the Bad Boys franchise and the highest-grossing film released in January.

In the United States and Canada, the film was released alongside Dolittle, and was initially projected to gross $35–45 million from 3,740 theaters during its three-day opening weekend, for a total of around $48 million over the full four-day MLK weekend. After making $23.5 million on its first day (including $6.36 million from Thursday night previews), estimates were raised to $68 million for four days. The film went on to debut to $62.2 million in its first three days, and $73.4 million over four, the second-best opening for the holiday. It made $34 million in its second weekend and $17.7 million in its third, remaining in first place both times.

The film's release in China was delayed following the country's movie theater closures that began in January 2020 as a result of the COVID-19 pandemic. Bad Boys For Life was eventually released in China on August 14, 2020, grossing $3.2 million in its first weekend. After the easing of initial restrictions in the US, the film was released in three Santikos Theatres locations in San Antonio, Texas on May 1, 2020.

Critical response
IndieWire described reviews for Bad Boys for Life as "mostly positive", while Screen Rant stated the critics were "generally positive". The website's critics consensus reads: "Loaded up with action and a double helping of leading-man charisma, Bad Boys for Life reinvigorates this long-dormant franchise by playing squarely to its strengths." On Metacritic, the film has a weighted average score of 59 out of 100, based on 46 critics, indicating "mixed or average reviews". Audiences polled by CinemaScore gave the film an average grade of "A" on an A+ to F scale, equivalent to the first two films. PostTrak reported an average rating of 4.5 out of 5 stars, with 73% of their respondents saying they would definitely recommend it.

Todd McCarthy of The Hollywood Reporter wrote that "the third time really is the charm," and added, "The two directors roll with ease between raucous comedy and raw drama, to considerable effect, just as they crank up the tension on any number of occasions, occasionally with palpably visceral impact." David Ehrlich of IndieWire gave the film a "B" grade, calling it a "fun, explosive, and even thoughtful action movie," and wrote, "Bad Boys for Life doesn't aim to raise the bar on its genre or rewrite the blockbuster rulebook, but it's a blast watching Lawrence and Smith revisit these characters and find a sensible place for them in the current Hollywood landscape."

Accolades

Sequel
Following the opening weekend box-office success of the film, Sony announced plans for a fourth installment, with Chris Bremner returning to write the script.

In April 2022, it was reported that development for the fourth film was being put on hold in light of the incident with Will Smith slapping Chris Rock at the 2022 Academy Awards ceremony. However, the following month Sony head chairman Tom Rothman confirmed the fourth film was still in development, despite the previous report.  In February 2023, Smith and Lawrence jointly announced through their social media accounts that the fourth film had just started pre-production, with Adil and Bilall also returning to direct from the script written by Bremner. That same month, it was reported by musician/disc jockey Questlove that Smith had to drop out of a planned surprise appearance at the 65th Grammy Awards because production for the fourth Bad Boys film had started earlier that week. Principal photography is scheduled to begin on April 3, 2023 in Atlanta, Georgia.

Notes

References

External links

 
 

2020 films
2020 action comedy films
2020s buddy comedy films
2020s police comedy films
2020s American films
African-American films
African-American action films
African-American comedy films
American films about revenge
American action comedy films
American buddy comedy films
American buddy cop films
American police detective films
American sequel films
Bad Boys (franchise)
Columbia Pictures films
2020s English-language films
Fictional portrayals of the Miami-Dade Police Department
Films about Mexican drug cartels
Films directed by Adil El Arbi and Bilall Fallah
Films produced by Doug Belgrad
Films produced by Jerry Bruckheimer
Films produced by Will Smith
Films scored by Lorne Balfe
Films set in 2020
Films set in Mexico City
Films set in Miami
Films shot in Atlanta
Films shot in Mexico City
Films shot in Miami
Films with screenplays by Chris Bremner
Films with screenplays by Joe Carnahan
Films with screenplays by Peter Craig
Hood films
Midlife crisis films
Overbrook Entertainment films